Dr. John Harold Cascaden (December 3, 1840 – August 31, 1904) was an Ontario physician and political figure. He represented Elgin West in the Legislative Assembly of Ontario from 1879 to 1886 as a Liberal members.

He was born in Ballintra, County Donegal, Ireland on December 3, 1840 and emigrated to Bruce County, Canada West with his family in 1850. He studied at the University of Toronto, receiving an M.D. in 1863, and at the Royal College of Physicians in London, England. After his first wife, Catherine Cascaden nee Ferguson, died in 1871, John Cascaden married Hannah Katherine Decou in 1872.  John and Hannah had five children: David Arthur (b: 1874), Annie May (b:1875), John Harold (b:1879), Douglas Jerald (b:1881), and Gordon L. (b:1884).    He served as coroner for Elgin County.  John died August 31, 1904 and is buried in the cemetery of St. Stephen's Anglican Church in Dunwich, Elgin County, Ontario.

References

External links 
The Canadian parliamentary companion and annual register, 1880, CH Mackintosh

1840 births
Ontario Liberal Party MPPs
Irish emigrants to Canada
1904 deaths
People from County Down
Canadian coroners